James Farley (1888–1976) was an American politician in New York.

James or Jim Farley may also refer to:

 James Farley (actor) (1882–1947), American actor
 James B. Farley (1930–2007), American business executive 
 James C. Farley (1854–?), American photographer
 James Indus Farley (1871–1948), American politician in Indiana
 James Lewis Farley (1823–1885), British orientalist
 James T. Farley (1829–1886), American politician in California
 Jim Farley (businessman) (born 1962), American automobile executive; the CEO of Ford
 James A. Farley Building, a historic landmark building named after James Farley